City Hall Plaza Aore Nagaoka is a multi-purpose arena and city hall in Nagaoka, Niigata, Japan. It is the home arena of the Niigata Albirex BB of the B.League, Japan's professional basketball league.

Gallery

References

External links
Aore Nagaoka

Basketball venues in Japan
Indoor arenas in Japan
Niigata Albirex BB
Sports venues in Niigata Prefecture
Buildings and structures in Nagaoka, Niigata
Sports venues completed in 2012
2012 establishments in Japan